Plutonium compounds are compounds containing the element plutonium (Pu). At room temperature, pure plutonium is silvery in color but gains a tarnish when oxidized. The element displays four common ionic oxidation states in aqueous solution and one rare one:
 Pu(III), as Pu3+ (blue lavender)
 Pu(IV), as Pu4+ (yellow brown)

The color shown by plutonium solutions depends on both the oxidation state and the nature of the acid anion. It is the acid anion that influences the degree of complexing—how atoms connect to a central atom—of the plutonium species. Additionally, the formal +2 oxidation state of plutonium is known in the complex [K(2.2.2-cryptand)] [PuIICp″3], Cp″ = C5H3(SiMe3)2.

A +8 oxidation state is possible as well in the volatile tetroxide .

Metallic plutonium is produced by reacting plutonium tetrafluoride with barium, calcium or lithium at 1200 °C. Metallic plutonium is attacked by acids, oxygen, and steam but not by alkalis and dissolves easily in concentrated hydrochloric, hydroiodic and perchloric acids. Molten metal must be kept in a vacuum or an inert atmosphere to avoid reaction with air. At 135 °C the metal will ignite in air and will explode if placed in carbon tetrachloride.

Plutonium is a reactive metal. In moist air or moist argon, the metal oxidizes rapidly, producing a mixture of oxides and hydrides. If the metal is exposed long enough to a limited amount of water vapor, a powdery surface coating of PuO2 is formed. Also formed is plutonium hydride but an excess of water vapor forms only PuO2.

Plutonium shows enormous, and reversible, reaction rates with pure hydrogen, forming plutonium hydride. It also reacts readily with oxygen, forming PuO and PuO2 as well as intermediate oxides; plutonium oxide fills 40% more volume than plutonium metal. The metal reacts with the halogens, giving rise to compounds with the general formula PuX3 where X can be F, Cl, Br or I and PuF4 is also seen. The following oxyhalides are observed: PuOCl, PuOBr and PuOI. It will react with carbon to form PuC, nitrogen to form PuN and silicon to form PuSi2.

The organometallic chemistry of plutonium complexes is typical for organoactinide species; a characteristic example of an organoplutonium compound is plutonocene. Computational chemistry methods indicate an enhanced covalent character in the plutonium-ligand bonding.

Powders of plutonium, its hydrides and certain oxides like Pu2O3
are pyrophoric, meaning they can ignite spontaneously at ambient temperature and are therefore handled in an inert, dry atmosphere of nitrogen or argon. Bulk plutonium ignites only when heated above 400 °C. Pu2O3 spontaneously heats up and transforms into PuO2, which is stable in dry air, but reacts with water vapor when heated.

Crucibles used to contain plutonium need to be able to withstand its strongly reducing properties. Refractory metals such as tantalum and tungsten along with the more stable oxides, borides, carbides, nitrides and silicides can tolerate this. Melting in an electric arc furnace can be used to produce small ingots of the metal without the need for a crucible.

Cerium is used as a chemical simulant of plutonium for development of containment, extraction, and other technologies.

See also 

 Uranium compounds
 Neptunium compounds
 Americium compounds
 Samarium compounds

Notes

References 

Compounds
 
Chemical compounds by element